= Leachtown, West Virginia =

Leachtown
- Unincorporated community
- Location within the state of West Virginia Leachtown (the United States)
- Coordinates: 39°8′31″N 81°26′35″W
- Country: United States
- State: West Virginia
- County: Wood
- Elevation: 636 ft (194 m)
- Time zone: UTC-5 (Eastern (EST))
  - Summer (DST): UTC-4 (EDT)
- GNIS feature ID: 1554928

Leachtown is an unincorporated community located in Wood County, West Virginia, United States.
